The Halbert L. Dunn Award is the most prestigious award presented by the National Association for Public Health Statistics and Information Systems (NAPHSIS). The award has been presented since 1981 providing national recognition of outstanding and lasting contributions to the field of vital and health statistics at the national, state, or local level.  

The award was established in honor of the late Halbert L. Dunn, M.D., Director of the National Office of Vital Statistics from 1936 to 1960.  Dr. Dunn was highly instrumental in encouraging the states to establish state vital statistics associations and played a major role in developing NAPHSIS.  The award is presented at the Hal Dunn Awards Luncheon during the association’s annual meeting. 
 
The winners of the Halbert L. Dunn Award have been:

Source: NAPHSIS

1981  Deane Huxtable
1982  Loren Chancellor
1983  Vito Logrillo
1984  Carl Erhardt
1985  Irvin Franzen
1986  W. D. "Don" Carroll
1987  Margaret Shackelford
1988  John Brockert, State Registrar, Utah
1989  Margaret Watts
1990  John Patterson
1991  Patricia Potrzebowski, State Registrar, Pennsylvania
1992  Rose Trasatti, National Association for Public Health Statistics and Information Systems (NAPHSIS)
1993  Garland Land, State Registrar, Missouri
1994  George Van Amburg
1995  Jack Smith
1996  no award
1997  Ray Nashold
1998  Iwao Moriyama
1999  no award
2000  George Gay
2001  Dorothy Harshbarger, State Registrar, Alabama
2002  Lorne Phillips, State Registrar, Kansas
2003  Mary Anne Freedman, Director of the Division of Vital Statistics, NCHS
2004  no award
2005  Joe Carney
2006  Dan Friedman
2007  Harry Rosenberg, National Center for Health Statistics
2008  Alvin T. Onaka, Registrar, Hawaii
2009  Marshall Evans, National Center for Health Statistics
2010  Steven Schwartz, Registrar, New York City
2011  Charles Rothwell, Director, National Center for Health Statistics
2012  no award
2013  Stephanie Ventura, Director of Reproductive Statistics Branch, National Center for Health Statistics
2014  Bruce Cohen, Director of Research, MA Department of Health
2015  Isabelle Horon, State Registrar, Maryland
2016  Rose Trasatti Heim, NAPHSIS
2017  Jennifer Woodward, State Registrar, Oregon
2018  Glenn Copeland, State Registrar, Michigan
2019  Delton Atkinson, National Center for Health Statistics
2020  no award
2021  no award
2022  Jeff Duncan, State Registrar, Michigan

See also

 List of mathematics awards
 List of medicine awards

References

Vital statistics (government records)
Medicine awards
Statistical awards
Awards established in 1981